The Jerusalem File is a 1972 film directed by John Flynn. It stars Bruce Davison, Nicol Williamson, Daria Halprin, and Donald Pleasence.

Plot
The film follows a young American named David, who comes to Israel to study and finds an Arab friend who legally lives there. Before long he finds 
himself involved with others and finds not all in Israel is as it appears. The action takes place before the 1967 Six Day War.

Cast
Bruce Davison as David 
Nicol Williamson as Lang
Daria Halprin as Nurit
Donald Pleasence as Samuels
Ian Hendry as Mayers
Koya Yair Rubin as Barak 
Zeev Revah as Raschid
David Smader as Herzen
Jack Cohen as Allouli

Production
Director John Flynn later recalled the original script was bad but Troy Kennedy Martin rewrote it and Flynn loved the result. The movie was shot in Israel. Flynn:
I stayed at the American Colony Hotel in east Jerusalem, further refining the script while waiting for the production money to come in. All the foreign journalists congregated in the bar of that hotel. So I’d be sitting there in that cavern, as they called it, with all these gentlemen of the press, getting the inside dope on what was really happening in Israel... I never saw Ian Hendry sober, but he somehow managed to function. He’d start with a couple of shots in the morning, but it didn’t seem to affect him. He’d say his lines clearly. Hendry was a perfectly functioning alcoholic when I worked with him. Nicol Williamson (who played an archaeologist) was a wild man too. Very heavy drinker. Late one night, Nicol got quite loaded and threatened to throw Bob Dylan off a hotel balcony!

Reception
The Jerusalem File was met with mixed reception from critics. A. H. Weiler of The New York Times concluded his review stating, "The politics, the disparate motivations and the implicit drama of youth defeated by a world they don't want are only vaguely projected and are secondary to the chase and shoot-em-up action of The Jerusalem File."

Flynn said the film "didn’t do well at the box office and has all but disappeared."

See also
List of American films of 1972

References

External links

1970s action thriller films
American action thriller films
Films directed by John Flynn
Films scored by John Scott (composer)
Films set in 1967
Films set in Jerusalem
Films shot in Israel
Israeli–Palestinian conflict films
Films with screenplays by Troy Kennedy Martin
1970s English-language films
1970s American films